BlackByrd is a South Africa pop trio from Cape Town. Formed in 2012, the group currently consists of Tarryn Lamb, Axene Chaberski and Tamsyn Maker. BlackByrd’s sound is firmly rooted in pop-country with ballads about love and heartbreak. The band formed after Tarryn Lamb posted an advert on Gumtree in 2012, looking for other musicians to start an all-girl group. Within a couple of months, they were signed by EMI and released their debut album, Strong.

BlackByrd have released two studio albums and have performed as opening acts for international artist, such as Mike + The Mechanics, Patrizio Buanne and Jamiroquai. They have won two South African Music Awards for their albums, including Best Duo or Group Award.

References
 
 
 
 
 
 
 

South African musical groups